Hardeep Singh (born 23 June 1995) is an Indian cricketer. He made his Twenty20 debut on 9 November 2019, for Uttar Pradesh in the 2019–20 Syed Mushtaq Ali Trophy.

References

External links
 

1995 births
Living people
Indian cricketers
Uttar Pradesh cricketers
Place of birth missing (living people)